Szafarnia  is a village in the administrative district of Gmina Radomin, within Golub-Dobrzyń County, Kuyavian-Pomeranian Voivodeship, in north-central Poland.

The village has a population of 280.

Chopin
At the age of 14 and 15, Frédéric Chopin visited Szafarnia as the guest of Juliusz Dziewanowski, father of Chopin's schoolmate Dominik Dziewanowski. Chopin's father was a tutor to the Dziewanowski family and Juliusz was the godfather to Chopin's sister. The families maintained warm relations past Frédéric's death 

The manor where Chopin stayed during his 1824 and 1825 summer vacations, has been turned into a museum.

It was here that young Chopin wrote his famous Kuriery Szafarskie (Szafarnia Couriers) spoofing the Warsaw newspapers.

References

Szafarnia